Rap? is the debut EP by American rapper Tierra Whack. It was released on December 2, 2021, by Interscope Records. The album is mainly produced by J Melodic and conscripts other producers including J-Louis, Sam Gellaitry and T-Minus.

Critical reception 

The EP received positive reviews. Pitchfork gave the EP a 6.0 out of 10 rating, saying: "The Philadelphia rapper's new EP may be more straightforward than usual, but even at her most conventional, Whack is at least attempting to keep you off-balance."

Track listing

References

2021 EPs
Interscope Records EPs